Thyrsa Wealtheow Amos (1879 in Indiana – 5 May 1941) was the Dean of Women and Professor of Education at the University of Pittsburgh, Pennsylvania, United States, from 1919 to 1941. She was the founder and First President of the Pennsylvania Association of Deans of Women, the founder of the Society of Cwens, and the president of the National Association of Deans of Women (NADW). Her main area of interest was in student personnel, especially for women. She was also a member of the American Association of University Women.

Amos Hall, an all-female residence hall at Schenley Quadrangle that houses nine sororities, is named after her. It was dedicated to Amos on  June 9, 1961.

Biography
Her father was Joseph B Amos, who lived in Indiana. She earned her bachelor's degree in Psychology in 1917 and a Master of Arts degree in Educational Psychology with a concentration in Mental Testing, and Educational Measurements in 1919, both at the University of Kansas. Her Master's thesis was titled "High School Normal Training as Preparation for Rural Teaching".

She visited Howard University during the 1924-5 school year to attend meetings and give talks to the female students.

She is buried at the Fairview Shawnee Cemetery in Pottawatomie County, Oklahoma.

University of Pittsburgh

Dean of Women

The Office of Dean of Women was created at a select number of established universities in the early 1900s to ensure that, outside the classroom, experiences of female students complimented their overall academic success. Amos was Dean of Women from 1919 to 1941.

The original office for the Dean of Women and other women's organizations was in Heinz House, a one-story wooden building north of Alumni Hall (now known as Eberly Hall) that was built in 1919. In 1924, Heinz House was closed, and all offices were moved to the Cathedral of Learning.

Braun Room
Her office moved to the twelfth floor of the Cathedral of Learning.  The office space on the twelfth floor was still unfinished when Dan Amos died in 1941. The Alumnae Association created the Thyrsa W. Amos Fund to plaster the walls and to furnish Room 1217 in her name. Room 1217 was never finished, but after World War II the other rooms on the twelfth floor were completed including the Braun room which served as a meeting space for women students.

Mrs. A. E. Braun donated the furnishings and floral carved mahogany wood paneling which she had purchased in 1941 from the library of the home of Grant McCargo in the East End of Pittsburgh. The Braun Room was dedicated in 1946 and serves, along with its furniture, as an example of a modern reproduction of Louis XV design. Original blue carpeting was replaced in 1955 with an oriental rug, named "The Iron Rug of Persia", that was donated by the daughter and son-in-law of A. E. Braun. Other features of the room include a low bookcase, bordered and topped with classic carving, that was crafted by university carpenters to replace the original fireplace whose inclusion was impractical on the 12th floor, along with two crystal drop chandeliers.

Dean Helen Pool Rush and her successor, Dean Savina Skewis, carried on the traditions of Dean Amos until the Dean of Women's Office was closed in 1969, and its functions and quarters were assumed by other departments.

Society of Cwens

Amos was an important influence in making mentoring, instead of hazing, the focus of women's organizations on campus.

In the early 1920s, Dean Thyrsa Amos saw the need for a society for outstanding sophomore women, as the University of Pittsburgh had recently started the Society of Druids for sophomore men. On 7 November 1922, twelve sophomore women responded to invitations and met at Heinz House, electing to found a society to sponsor activities for all freshmen and sophomore women and to "select for membership in the spring those freshman women who displayed the finest Pitt spirit, showed good scholarship and expressed interest in activities through fine participation in them". The society was named Cwens, from the word cwēn, meaning "lady" or "queen" in Anglo-Saxon. The emblem selected was a golden crown resting upon a sceptre.

In 1975, the Title IX Education Amendments mandated the abolishment of single-sex organizations in institutions of higher learning. In October 1975, Cwens chapter presidents gave authority to the National Executive Board to disband the society and to formulate plans for a national sophomore honor society for both men and women. The National Board disbanded the National Society of Cwens, founding the Lambda Sigma Society as a direct descendant on 6 March 1976.

Publications
 I, Myself, and Me (1939)
 Attitudes (1939)
 And So to College: A Series of Six Radio Talks (1928)
 Educational values of the department of the dean of women (1927)
 The child self in the normal adult
 Some Data on the Intellectual Self

References

Further reading
 

1879 births
1941 deaths
University of Pittsburgh faculty
Deans of women